{{Infobox person
| image         =
| name          = Brian Jepson
| image_caption = 
| image_size    = 
| birth_name     = 
| birth_date    = August 27, 1970
| birth_place   = Houston, Texas
| death_date    = 
| death_place   = 
| occupation    = Voice actor, musician, illustrator
| spouse        = Courtney
| parents       = 
| children      = 
| credits       =  Guyver: The Bio-Boosted Armoras Agito Makishima/Guyver III Kagaku Ninja Tai Gatchamanas Joe the Condor/G2 Steam Detectivesas Knight PhantomWedding PeachKazuya Yanagiba/Limone
| website           = 
}}Brian Jepson' is an American voice actor who works for Elephant Productions. He has done voice over work for Tx DOT, PBS, The Lance Armstrong Foundation, ADV Films, Sony Entertainment Online, and Retro Studios. Brian is a singer/guitar player, graphic designer and stage actor.

Biography

Brian was born in Houston, Texas.

Brian attended Sharpstown High School and then The University of Texas at Austin.

Brian was a member of Austin's Beatles Tribute Band, The Eggmen for 10 years. The Eggmen won the Austin Chronicle's Music Award for 'Best Cover Band' seven times from 2000 through 2009.

Brian is a founding member of the Rutles tribute band OUCH!

Brian is also a member of The Nairobi Trio, an Austin-based band whose original music and stage show is planted firmly between Liverpool and Luckenbach, musically.

Brian is a graphic designer as well as a veteran stage performer. He is a member of the Austin, TX theater company Onstage Theatre Co.

Brian is married and lives with his wife and their sons in Austin, in Texas.

Brian has a wet shaving related YouTube account that goes under the name of SinatraLennon.

Filmography

Live ActionRed Winds - Television Narrator

AnimeBlade of the Phantom Master - YuiteComic Party Revolution - Manga Artist (ep.12)Eden's Bowy - WittoFinal Fantasy: Unlimited - OschaGatchaman - Joe The Condor, Capone, Commander Chokula, Dave, Demon 5 Drums, Insect Commander (ep.17), Co-Pilot (ep.47), Goat-Bearded Minion (ep.50), Governor (ep.64), Waiter (ep.96)Gatchaman (OVA) - Joe The CondorGatchaman (film) - Joe The CondorGetbackers - SakaiGuyver: The Bioboosted Armor - Agito Makishima/Guyver III, Purg'Stall, ToriiMazinkaiser - Tetsuya TsurugiProject Blue Earth SOS - Prof. Thomas Steamson, RobertPumpkin Scissors - Lionel Taylor, Snubnose, Thin Hoodlum (ep.13)Steam Detectives - Knight PhantomWedding Peach - Kazuya Yanagiba/LimoneWedding Peach DX - Kazuya Yanagiba/Limone, Golden Mask, Belphegor

Video Games
 DC Universe Online - Felix Faust, Sentinels of Magic/Cultist, Ultra-Humanite, Parallax, Servo, Additional Voices
 Metroid Prime 3: Corruption - Additional Voices
 Wizard 101 - Cyrus Drake, Additional Voices
 Wii Swords - Knight, Pirate
 Pirate101'' - Captain Avery, Kobe Yojimbo, Napoleguin, Additional Voices

References

External links
 
 

American male voice actors
Living people
People from Houston
1989 births